Catherine Beatrice of Savoy (6 November 1636, Turin, Piedmont – 27 August 1637) was a Princess of Savoy by birth. She was the youngest daughter born to Victor Amadeus I, Duke of Savoy, and his French consort, Princess Christine Marie of France.

Biography

Born at the Castello del Valentino, the "country" residence of the Dukes of Savoy, she was the youngest of twins born to the Duke and Duchess. Her sister Princess Henriette Adelaide was the older of the two.

She died at the palace she was born, the Castello del Valentino. She was buried at the Basilica of Saint Andrew in Vercelli. Her father died a month after her death and her mother became ruler of Savoy as its Regent.

Ancestors

1636 births
1637 deaths
Nobility from Turin
Italian twins
Princesses of Savoy
17th-century Italian nobility
17th-century Italian women
Royalty and nobility who died as children
Daughters of monarchs